Lazarus Phillips,  (October 10, 1895 – December 30, 1986) was a Canadian lawyer and Senator.

Born in Montreal, Quebec, he served with the Canadian Expeditionary Force in Siberia during World War I. In 1918, he received a Bachelor of Civil Law from McGill University and was called to the Quebec Bar in 1920. A practicing lawyer, he was a senior partner of the Montreal law firm, Phillips and Vineberg (now Davies Ward Phillips & Vineberg).

A member of the Liberal Party of Canada, he ran unsuccessfully for the House of Commons of Canada in the riding of Cartier in the 1943 by-election, losing to Communist Party member Fred Rose (he also garnered more votes than future NDP leader, David Lewis). He was called to the senate in 1968 representing the senatorial division of Rigaud, Quebec. He retired in 1970.

A prominent member of the Montreal Jewish community, he was president of the school, United Talmud Torahs of Montreal. He was a director and vice-president of the Royal Bank of Canada.

The Senator Lazarus Phillips Chair in General History in the Faculty of Jewish Studies at Bar-Ilan University is named in his honour.

References
 Lazarus Phillips fonds, Library and Archives Canada.

External links

 World War I personnel file

1895 births
1986 deaths
Lawyers from Montreal
Canadian senators from Quebec
Canadian military personnel of World War I
Jewish Canadian politicians
Liberal Party of Canada candidates for the Canadian House of Commons
Liberal Party of Canada senators
McGill University Faculty of Law alumni
Military personnel from Montreal
Politicians from Montreal
Canadian Officers of the Order of the British Empire
Quebec candidates for Member of Parliament